County Manager may refer to:

Chief executive (Irish local government), formerly known as County or City Council manager
County executive, in the United States